Karl Eduard Kompus (also Kaarel Eduard Kompus; 3 April 1903 Suure-Kambja – 25 August 1942 Sverdlovsk Oblast) was an Estonian politician. He was a member of Estonian National Assembly. Kompus was arrested by Soviet authorities following the Soviet occupation of Estonia in 1940. He was executed by gunshot in Sverdlovsk Oblast in 1942.

References

1903 births
1942 deaths
Members of the Estonian National Assembly
Estonian people executed by the Soviet Union
People who died in the Gulag
People from Kambja Parish